Andorra participated in the ninth Winter Paralympics in Turin, Italy. 

Andorra entered two athletes, Xavier Barios and Francesca Ramirez, both in alpine skiing. Neither won a medal.

Medalists

See also

2006 Winter Paralympics
Andorra at the 2006 Winter Olympics

References

External links
Torino 2006 Paralympic Games
International Paralympic Committee

2006
Nations at the 2006 Winter Paralympics
Winter Paralympics